The 2021 Oakville Labour Day Classic was held from September 3 to 6 at the Oakville Curling Club in Oakville, Ontario. The total purse for the event was $15,000 on the men's side and $20,000 on the women's side.

Team Jacobs, consisting of Brad Jacobs, Marc Kennedy, E. J. Harnden and Ryan Harnden won the men's event, defeating the Jonathan Beuk rink skipped by Tanner Horgan in the final which only went four ends. Jacobs blanked the first end before taking a big score of five in the second. Beuk followed this up with a score of two in the third but ultimately shook hands after a score of three by Jacobs in the fourth. Jacobs received $6,000 for their win while Beuk took home $3,000. To reach the final, Jacobs finished 5–0 through the round robin and knocked off Tyler Tardi 6–3 in the semifinal. Beuk also earned a direct bye to the semifinal, finishing 4–1 through the preliminary stage. They then bested the Glenn Howard rink in the semifinal 3–2 in a rematch of the 2021 Oakville Fall Classic final, held the week prior.

Team Fleury won the women's event, edging out the Suzanne Birt rink 8–7 in the final. It wasn't an easy win for the Fleury rink, consisting of Tracy Fleury, Selena Njegovan, Liz Fyfe and Kristin MacCuish, as they came back from a 7–4 deficit after six ends to claim the title. Birt began with hammer and opened the scoring with a huge three points. The teams then traded singles before Fleury scored a deuce and stole in the fifth to level the score. Birt responded immediately with three in the sixth, giving them a comfortable three point lead heading into the seventh end. Fleury rallied back again, however, nailing a double takeout to even the score 7–7 heading into the last end. On her last shot, Suzanne Birt needed a draw to the button to secure the win, however, she came up heavy, resulting in a steal of one for Fleury and the victory. Fleury received $7,000 for their win with Birt earning $3,500 for second place. Heading into the final, Fleury and Birt shared identical 6–0 records, both finishing the round robin with 4–0 records and winning their quarterfinal and semifinal matches.

Men

Teams
The teams are listed as follows:

Round-robin standings 
Final round-robin standings

Round-robin results 
All draw times are listed in Eastern Time (UTC−04:00).

Draw 2
Friday, September 3, 6:00 pm

Draw 4
Saturday, September 4, 10:00 am

Draw 6
Saturday, September 4, 5:30 pm

Draw 8
Sunday, September 5, 9:00 am

Draw 9
Sunday, September 5, 12:30 pm

Draw 10
Sunday, September 5, 4:00 pm

Playoffs

Source:

Quarterfinals
Sunday, September 5, 8:00 pm

Semifinals
Monday, September 6, 9:00 am

Final
Monday, September 6, 12:30 pm

Women

Teams
The teams are listed as follows:

Round-robin standings 
Final round-robin standings

Round-robin results 
All draw times are listed in Eastern Time (UTC−04:00).

Draw 1
Friday, September 3, 3:30 pm

Draw 3
Friday, September 3, 9:00 pm

Draw 5
Saturday, September 4, 2:00 pm

Draw 7
Saturday, September 4, 9:00 pm

Draw 9
Sunday, September 5, 12:30 pm

Playoffs

Source:

Quarterfinals
Sunday, September 5, 8:00 pm

Semifinals
Monday, September 6, 9:00 am

Final
Monday, September 6, 12:30 pm

Notes

References

External links
Men's Event
Women's Event

2021 in Canadian curling
Curling in Ontario
September 2021 sports events in Canada
2021 in Ontario
Oakville, Ontario